Comparative Islamic Studies is a peer-reviewed academic journal published by Equinox.

See also 
 Buddhist-Christian Studies

References

External links

Biannual journals
English-language journals
Equinox Publishing (Sheffield) academic journals
Publications established in 2005
Islamic studies journals
Multidisciplinary humanities journals
Comparative religion